Job van Uitert (born 10 October 1998 in Dongen) is a racing driver from the Netherlands. He is currently racing in the LMP2 class of the European Le Mans Series with Panis Racing.

Early career

Beginnings and Mazda MX-5 Cup 
Having come from a family of racing drivers, Van Uitert began racing in karts at the age of seven until pausing his career two years later due to his competitors benefitting from a high amount of "illegal equipment". He returned to racing in 2014, where he raced in the national Mazda MX-5 Cup. Having driven for Geva Racing, the Dutchman finished third in the standings.

Lower formulae 
A move to single-seater racing was in order for the 2015 season, where Van Uitert would team up with Provily Racing for a campaign in the ADAC F4 Championship. As the lone entry of the team, Van Uitert struggled, failing to score any points throughout the year, ending up 33rd overall.

2016 would see the Dutch driver moving to Jenzer Motorsport, for whom he would perform double-duties in the ADAC and Italian F4 series. His results improved markedly in the latter championship, where six podiums, including a pair of wins at Imola, meant that Van Uitert finished the year fourth in the standings despite missing the second event.

In 2017, Van Uitert remained with Jenzer in the category, this time electing to focus on the season in Italy. This would prove to be an inspired decision, as the Dutchman was catapulted into a title battle with three podiums and a victory in Race 1 at Adria. Another win followed at Mugello, before Van Uitert once again ended up with three podiums in one event, taking two victories and one second place at the Imola Circuit. Having appeared on the rostrum three more times before the end of the season, Van Uitert ended his career in junior formulae as the runner-up of the Italian F4 Championship.

Sportscar career

2018: LMP3 Success 
Van Uitert progressed to endurance racing for 2018, driving in the LMP3 category of the European Le Mans Series with RLR MSport. His start in the discipline proved to be successful, as he won his very first race in the category at the Circuit Paul Ricard, before going on to win once more in Spielberg. One more podium during a rain-shortened race at Spa-Francorchamps helped Van Uitert, along with teammates John Farano and Rob Garofall, clinched the title at the final round.

2019: Wins in LMP2 
A move up to LMP2 was on the cards for Van Uitert the following year, as he entered the ELMS as part of the G-Drive Racing outfit. A pair of victories in Monza and Barcelona put the Dutchman and teammate Roman Rusinov to the top of the standings after the opening half of the campaign. Despite finishing second in Silverstone and getting points in the final two races, the team would lose out on the title to IDEC Sport in the season finale, as Van Uitert received a penalty for causing a collision with the French team's driver Memo Rojas at Portimão, thus ending up a mere four points behind their rivals in the standings.

2020: Repeated runner-up spot 
For the 2020 ELMS season, the Dutch driver switched to United Autosports. The season began positively with a win at Le Castellet, although the team would have to stay content with a pair of top-ten finishes during the next two rounds. With another podium being scored at Monza, Van Uitert and his teammates Alex Brundle and Will Owen finished second in the championship, losing out to the sister United car one event before the end of the campaign.

2021: Full season in WEC 
Van Uitert would race in two series on a full-time basis during 2021, remaining with United Autosports in the ELMS on one hand and joining Racing Team Nederland for the Pro-Am Cup of the FIA World Endurance Championship on the other. The season in the former championship would prove to be disappointing, as Van Uitert was unable to finish any higher than third at Le Castellet, which left him twelfth in the drivers' standings. Meanwhile, having missed one round of the WEC, Van Uitert and Giedo van der Garde helped their amateur driver Frits van Eerd to clinch Pro-Am honours in the latter.

2022: Consistent ELMS frontrunner 
2022 saw Van Uitert team up with Julien Canal and Nico Jamin in the ELMS, driving for Panis Racing. The squad delivered a strong season, finishing every race in the top four positions, which included four podium finishes. As a result, Van Uitert and his teammates became vice-champions, missing out on the title to a dominant Prema Racing.

2023 
In 2023, Van Uitert reunited with Panis to race in the ELMS.

Racing record

Career summary

† As Van Uitert was a guest driver, he was ineligible to score points.

Complete ADAC Formula 4 Championship results 
(key) (Races in bold indicate pole position) (Races in italics indicate fastest lap)

† As Van Uitert was a guest driver, he was ineligible to score points.

Complete Italian F4 Championship results
(key) (Races in bold indicate pole position) (Races in italics indicate fastest lap)

Complete European Le Mans Series results
(key) (Races in bold indicate pole position; results in italics indicate fastest lap)

Complete FIA World Endurance Championship results
(key) (Races in bold indicate pole position; races in italics indicate fastest lap)

† As Van Uitert was a guest driver, he was ineligible to score points.

Complete 24 Hours of Le Mans results

Complete IMSA SportsCar Championship results
(key) (Races in bold indicate pole position; results in italics indicate fastest lap)

† Points only counted towards the Michelin Endurance Cup, and not the overall LMP2 Championship.

References

External links
Profile at Driver Database
Official website

Dutch racing drivers
European Le Mans Series drivers
FIA World Endurance Championship drivers
24 Hours of Daytona drivers
24 Hours of Le Mans drivers
1998 births
Living people
ADAC Formula 4 drivers
Italian F4 Championship drivers
WeatherTech SportsCar Championship drivers
Jenzer Motorsport drivers
G-Drive Racing drivers
TDS Racing drivers
Racing Team Nederland drivers
United Autosports drivers
Starworks Motorsport drivers
Tech 1 Racing drivers
Le Mans Cup drivers